Berkovitsa Glacier is a glacier on Livingston Island, Antarctica situated east of Etar Snowfield, south of Medven Glacier, west-northwest of Tundzha Glacier and north-northeast of Verila Glacier.  It is bounded by the southeastern slopes of Oryahovo Heights and the northwestern slopes of Snow Peak.  It extends 4 km in southeast-northwest direction and 2.8 km in northwest-southeast direction, and drains northeastwards into Hero Bay between Avitohol Point and Remetalk Point.

The glacier is named after the town of Berkovitsa in the western Balkan Mountains, Bulgaria.

Location
Bulgarian mapping in 2005 and 2009.

See also
 List of glaciers in the Antarctic
 Glaciology

Maps
 L.L. Ivanov et al. Antarctica: Livingston Island and Greenwich Island, South Shetland Islands. Scale 1:100000 topographic map. Sofia: Antarctic Place-names Commission of Bulgaria, 2005.
 L.L. Ivanov. Antarctica: Livingston Island and Greenwich, Robert, Snow and Smith Islands. Scale 1:120000 topographic map.  Troyan: Manfred Wörner Foundation, 2009.

References
 Berkovitsa Glacier. SCAR Composite Gazetteer of Antarctica
 Bulgarian Antarctic Gazetteer. Antarctic Place-names Commission. (details in Bulgarian, basic data in English)

External links
 Berkovitsa Glacier. Copernix satellite image

Glaciers of Livingston Island